The 2022 Dakar Rally was a rally raid event held in Saudi Arabia and the 44th edition of the Dakar Rally organized by Amaury Sport Organisation (ASO). 
The event took place between 1–14 January 2022. This was the third time Saudi Arabia had hosted the event, with support from the Saudi Automobile and Motorcycle Federation. 
The race started in Ha'il and ended in Jeddah, going through canyons and cliffs in the Neom region, passing by the Red Sea coastline, into the stretches of dunes surrounding Riyadh, with a lot more action on sand dunes in the Empty Quarter. 
The route consisted of one prologue stage and 12 normal stages, with one rest day in Riyadh on 8 January.

When ASO signed the five-year deal with Saudi Arabia, there was a first-year exclusivity clause. Since it has expired, more countries could have been added to the route. However, due to COVID-19 travel restrictions, a decision has been made to remain entirely within Saudi Arabia.

In 2021, the FIA World Motor Sport Council granted full World Championship status to the FIA's cross-country rallying discipline. On 5 December 2021, the FIA and FIM jointly combined both of their cross-country rally championships to form the World Rally-Raid Championship, which is co-sponsored by both organizations. The 2022 Dakar Rally served as the first event in the inaugural championship calendar.

Summary

The route 
The feedback from competitors about previous event was that there were too many rocky surfaces resulting in excessive tyre wear and punctures, and not enough sandy stages which traditionally dominated Dakar rally. The organizers listened to the complaints and on 11 May 2021 revealed a new route which is characterized by a push into the sandy Empty Quarter. 
Same as last year, the route includes 1 Prologue stage, 12 stages including 2 loop stages and 1 marathon stage. The exact route was revealed in late November 2021. The route did not feature the Empty Quarter this year. Initially, due to very difficult terrain, the competitors were planned to be airlifted from stage 8 finish to Riyadh.

Changes 
Although initially promoted, last year's event did not have alternative fuels class, and only had several participants running on fuels different from petrol or diesel. In this edition there is stronger push to low-carbon vehicles, with an aim to have 100% low-carbon vehicles in the car, SSV and truck categories by 2030. 
This edition will include a new T1-E category, with rules drawn up in collaboration with the FIA. This category has been created for prototype vehicles relying on electric motors or any technology focused on reducing carbon emissions, such as biofuels and hydrogen. Audi Sport announced that it will enter three Audi RS Q e-tron to T1-E category. Driven by Carlos Sainz, Stéphane Peterhansel and Mattias Ekström, 
Audi Sport has set target of winning the rally. In truck category, Hino announced support in building a hybrid vehicle that will enter the event.

Pioneering the new T1.E class, Audi demanded tyre inflation-deflation system in the cockpit, a larger chassis, buggy-sized wheels (17 inches) and more suspension travel than the 4x4s in T1.1 category. Prodrive and Toyota Gazoo Racing teams objected, which forced the organizers to open up the possibility of a new T1+ category. The tyre inflation-deflation system controllable from the cockpit will remain exclusive to category T1.3 two-wheel drive buggies and the new T1-E hybrid or electric vehicles, "to optimise their energy consumption".

In order to balance the performance balance between factory teams, the organizers ASO and the FIA will continue using air restrictors. The diameters are still under review. Currently, Toyota's twin-turbo V6 petrol engine has a  air restrictor, the turbo-diesel engine in the X-Raid Mini buggy has a  air restrictor. Prodrive's twin-turbo V6 petrol engine is electronically limited by a power curve equal to the Toyota's.

Electronic roadbooks will become standard to all vehicles from the car, SSV and truck categories with a view of limiting the differences in assistance resources between the teams. The motorbikes and quads entered in the elite category will also get a version that has been adapted for them.

Bike and quad rider airbag vests introduced last year have received positive feedback. Airbag vest effectiveness and comfort have been improved.

In Dakar Classic category, the regularity will no longer be the only evaluation criteria. On portions representing roughly 20% of the route, only navigation will be judged and not time, and each excess kilometre covered will cost points.

Race
The 2022 Dakar Rally started on 1 January at Jeddah, with a prologue of 19 km, officially called stage 1A. For the motos only, the stage 1A times were multiplied by 5. Gas Gas entered the Dakar stage winners with a victory by Daniel Sanders, although Gas Gas used KTM 450 Rally bikes. Skyler Howes and José Ignacio Cornejo lost a lot of time on stage 1A and were more than 8 minutes behind the leader.
In the cars Guerlain Chicherit in a GCK Thunder buggy running on bio-ethanol fuel had problems with instrumentation and stopped on track.

On 2 January, just before the start of the race, it was announced that to heavy rains that flowed the bivouac, there wouldn't be any marathon stages in stage 2 and 3, but regular stages (with assistance park).
On stage 1B navigation was an issue and lots of drivers lost a significant amount of time finding a way point including, Ricky Brabec, Luciano and Kevin Benavides, Andrew Short, Juan Barreda, Toby Price, Maciej Giemza on bikes who lost between 30 and 50 minutes each on this waypoint.
Bad day for new Audi RS Q: Stephane Peterhansel had a crash and lost more than 7 hours, Mattias Ekstrom more than 1.5 hours, and Carlos Sainz more than 2 hours finding a waypoint in last 100 km which led him to make some criticism to organization.
Giniel de Villiers had an incident with the bike rider César Zumaran and later was awarded a 5 minutes penalty for not stopping to check for the health of the other competitor, breaching the sport regulations. On 4 January it was announced that another incident involving de Villiers was under investigation by running over Mohamedsaid Aoulad Ali's bike when climbing a dune, rendering it unusable, de Villiers circled around to check on the status of the rider, but again did not stop to offer assistance. He was given another time penalty, this time of 5 hours.

Also on stage 2, Loeb secured the victory on cars. In T3 category, the leader Seth Quintero had mechanical issues on that made him to penalize and being away from the fight for the final victory. In the following stage, Quintero would take advantage of his start from behind and secure another stage win.

On stage 3 maiden victories for Hero with Joaquim Rodrigues on bikes, and Carlos Sainz with his Audi RS Q e-tron, the first victory on Dakar of an hybrid vehicle. On T4 category WRC driver Andreas Mikkelsen had to retire after a crash.

Stage 4 and another victory for Nasser Al-Attiyah while Benediktas Vanagas in another Hilux T1+ suffered a rollover on stage and had to retire.

Stages 5 and 6 had different routes for FIM (Bikes and Quads), and FIA (Cars, Light weight, SSVs and trucks competitors. Stage 5 for bikes and quads had to be partially neutralized due to the high number os competitors needing assistance, meaning no rescue helicopters were available in the final sector of the stage. The riders who didn't concluded the stage, were given a standard time. In quads only one driver reached the end before neutralization was called. 
Danilo Petrucci made history being the first MotoGP rider to win a Dakar stage. Skyler Howes had to retire due to a head concussion while Joan Barreda had struggles to finish the stage but manage to start stage 6.

Stage 6 for bikes and quads was also neutralized after the first waypoint at km 101 due to rough track caused by heavy rain and the passage of cars and trucks in the day before. Neutralization came after quad rider Manuel Andújar crashed heavily in truck ruts, damaging the quad beyond repair. Andújar himself was in a state of shock, but otherwise okay.

Entry list

Number of entries

Vehicles and Categories

A total of 750 riders, drivers and co-drivers entered the event, among them 209 rookies (first-time entries), 130 legends (participating for the 10th or more years), 34 original by Motul (riders without support team) and 60 women. Another 315 drivers and co-drivers entered the Dakar Classic (classic car and truck categories). Five vehicles compete in the Open category (3 in T1, 1 in T3 and 1 in T4)

Competitor list

  – The "Dakar Legends" - competitors that participated in 10 or more Dakar events.  – The first time starters - "rookies".  – Competitors that were not able to start the race. – Competitors participating in "Original by Motul" — limited assistance marathon class.

  – The "Dakar Legends" - competitors that participated in 10 or more Dakar events.  – The first time starters - "rookies".  – Competitors that were not able to start the race. – Competitors participating in "Original by Motul" — limited assistance marathon class.

  – The "Dakar Legends" - competitors that participated in 10 or more Dakar events.  – The first time starters - "rookies".  – Competitors that were not able to start the race.

  – The "Dakar Legends" - competitors that participated in 10 or more Dakar events.  – The first time starters - "rookies".  – Competitors that were not able to start the race.

  – The "Dakar Legends" - competitors that participated in 10 or more Dakar events.  – The first time starters - "rookies".  – Late entries.  – Competitors that were not able to start the race.

  – The "Dakar Legends" - competitors that participated in 10 or more Dakar events.  – The first time starters - "rookies".  – Late entries.  – Competitors that were not able to start the race.

  – The "Dakar Legends" - competitors that participated in 10 or more Dakar events.  – The first time starters - "rookies".  – Competitors that were not able to start the race.

Notes

The Belorussian team MAZ-SPORTauto, consisting of three MAZ vehicles in T5 category were banned from taking part in the event. The organizers complied with sanctions, imposed by the EU on a number of individuals and entities in Belarus in summer 2021. The sanctions apply as MAZ-SPORTauto is a MAZ factory team, and MAZ is on the list of concerned entities. The organizers issued an official letter, stating that "the MAZ-SPORTauto team was not able to take part due to the EU regulation, which states that "no funds or economic resources may be directly or indirectly available to natural or legal persons, organizations or corporations that are on the list of persons and organizations subject to restrictive measures". The vehicles, which were en route to the port of Marseille were turned around in Poland, and the admission fees frozen for the MAZ-SPORTauto crews: 502 - Siarhei Viazovich, Pavel Haranin, Anton Zaparoshchanka; 507 - Aliaksei Vishneuski, Maksim Novikau, Siarhei Sachuk; 517 - Aliaksandr Vasileuski, Aliaksandr Shved, Vital Muryleu. MAZ-SPORTauto has been competing in Dakar Rally without interruption since 2012.

Dakar legend Erik Van Loon was tested positive for COVID-19 before departing for Saudi Arabia, and was not able to compete. His place in #217 Toyota Hilux Overdrive was offered to Bernhard Ten Brinke.

Stages 

Stage 2 was planned to be a marathon stage, with no-support marathon bivouac in Al Artawiyah. After heavy rain and storms, the bivouac got flooded, and subsequently was moved to Qaisumah. The marathon bivouac was cancelled, with competitors receiving normal support from their teams. Dakar Classic stage was cancelled completely, competitors moved to Qaisumah in liaison.

For stages 5 and 6, two separate route were prepared; one 421 km route and one 345 km route. For stage 5, cars, SSVs, and trucks completed the 421 km route while bikes and quads completed the 345 km route. For stage 6, the categories swapped places.

Stage winners

Stage results

Bikes

Quads

Cars

Light Prototypes

SSVs

Trucks

Classics

Final standings

Bikes

Quads

Original by Motol
The Original by Motol class, also known as the Malle Moto class, refers to bikes and quads competitors competing without any kind of assistance. The organizers provide 1 trunk per competitor for storage of the personal belongings, spare parts and tools. Competitors are only allowed to bring 1 headlight, 1 set of wheels, 1 set of tyres, 1 tent with sleeping bag and mattress, 1 travel bag and 1x 25 liter (6.6 gallon) backpack. Organizers allow free use of the generators, compressors and tool-boxes in the bivouac.

Cars

Light Prototypes

SSVs

Trucks

Classics

Incidents
On 30 December, a support vehicle with 6 competitors, including one driver, Philippe Boutron, exploded outside Donatello Hotel in Jeddah. Philippe Boutron sustained leg injuries and underwent an operation, while the others were unharmed. The news were only released on 1 January, meanwhile Saudi Arabia police ruled out criminal activity. FIA and ASO issued a statement expressing that "malice couldn't be ruled out at this time" and raised security level in the bivouacs, hotels and along all of the route. Later the organizers advised competitors to "observe the greatest vigilance" in light of the incident. On 4 January, French prosecutors opened an investigation on the incident, while on 7 January, French minister of Foreign Affairs stated that the incident was "perhaps" a terrorist attack and demanded more investigation and transparency from Saudi Arabia government.

Another vehicle was caught in a fire incident the same day - Alexander Pesci's Rebellion DXX buggy caught fire during the shakedown due to electrical fault, and was completely destroyed. Alexander Pesci took over teammate's Romain Dumas Rebellion DXX, while Romain Dumas was offered Nasser Al-Attiyah's previous year's Toyota Hilux.

Giniel de Villiers received penalties for collisions on consecutive stages. On stage 1, de Villiers collided with motorcyclist César Zumaran and did not stop to offer assistance. Race organizers assigned a five-minute penalty for the incident. During the next day's stage, de Villiers collided with motorcyclist Mohamedsaid Aoulad Ali, in the process running over Ali's bike and rendering it unusable. de Villiers circled around to check on the status of the rider, but again did not stop to offer assistance. Race organizers assigned a harsher five-hour penalty for de Villiers' repeat offense. In addition, de Villiers came to an agreement with Ali to fully pay for repairs of the damaged bike and for Ali's registration fee for the 2023 running of the Dakar. The five-hour penalty was reversed by the FIA 2 days later, after de Villiers' team presented evidence that the standard in-car warning system did not sound until 2 seconds before the collision with Ali's bike.

Quad rider Toni Vingut crashed out on stage 2 and suffered two cracked ribs and a fracture in the fibula of his right leg. He was evacuated in the emergency helicopter to a hospital.

During Stage 4 on January 5, Belgian motorcyclist Walter Roelants suffered a crash past the 198 km point of the stage. Roelants suffered serious back injuries, but remained conscious and indicated that he still had feeling in his legs. He was evacuated from the stage by helicopter and taken to hospital in stable condition.

American motorcyclist Skyler Howes finished stage 5 with head, ankle and shoulder injuries, but without any memory of a crash. After medical inspection, he was not allowed to continue race.

Jean-Pascal Besson and co-driver Patrice Roissac were involved in a heavy crash on stage 5. Both participants were reported unconscious, and were airlifted to hospital. Besson suffered broken collarbone, while Roissac suffered back injury.

On Stage 6 on January 7, the bikes and quads route was ended early due to numerous crashes caused by the deterioration of the stage from the previous day's pass by cars and trucks. Among those involved was Botswanan motorcyclist Ross Branch, who had to be transported back to the bivouac following a crash.

En route to the early morning start of the stage 7 Gas Gas rider Daniel Sanders suffered a serious high-speed fall and was taken to hospital with a broken hand.

A head-on collision occurred on stage 7 between the SSV driven by Sergey Karyakin and the light-proto driven by Marco Carrara. Both vehicles were taking a sharp turn behind a rock and were only several meters away from each other before they could take any action to avoid the collision. Both drivers argued their point, and ultimately blamed the organizers for poor quality of the roadbook directions. The accident caused spinal injuries to Carrara's co-driver Enrico Gaspari, while Karyakin suffered a broken finger while making repairs to the damaged vehicle.

Dakar rookie bike rider Isaac Feliu suffered a heavy fall on stage 9, causing trauma to head and chest. Another rider, Harite Gabari stopped to assist, and called the emergency services. The emergency helicopter delivered Feliu to hospital, where his condition is described serious, but as not posing danger to life.

During the liaison for stage 12, a collision occurred between an assistance car for the PH-Sport team and a truck driven by a local resident. Quentin Lavallée, the chief mechanic for the #726 Peugeot 205 T16 for the PH-Sport team, was killed in the crash. Passenger Maxime Frère also suffered injuries in the accident, but remained conscious and was transported to hospital.

External links
 Dakar Live timing
 World Rally Raid Championship website (with stage times)

References 

Dakar Rally
Saudi Arabia sport-related lists
Dakar
Dakar
Dakar Rally
Dakar Rally